Rishi Moolam is a 1980 Indian Tamil-language film, directed by S. P. Muthuraman and written by Mahendran. The film stars Sivaji Ganesan and K. R. Vijaya. It is based on Mahendran's play of the same name. The film was released on 26 January 1980.

Plot 
SP Santhosh IPS has a past life. He hides that from his wife Gokila. Gokila loves her husband Santhosh and her son Ashok but at the same time she has a policy that she will forgive anything but not the lair.

At one point when she learns that her husband Santhosh was a petty thief, she confronts with him and leaves him and their son. She goes to her Justice father and lives at his home. She applies for the divorce in court but the judgement was given in favor of Santhosh.

Though Santhosh wins the case but still he is feeling guilty and resigns his SP job. Also he talk to Gokila and tell her that he will give her the divorce and leaves her with his son.

He finds a new job as a tea estate supervisor. He meets Thangam and request her to be the caretaker for his son. When he realises that the caretaker fall in love on him, Santhosh talked to her and get her married to a labor in his tea estate.

Meanwhile Gokila realises her mistake through her childhood teacher and in search of her husband and her son.

Time flies by and his son Ashok grows and become a champion in Tennis. Ashok has another name Amarnath and become a famous Tennis player. While hearing this Gokila and her father feels very happy. Kokila's father goes to meet Amarnath. Gokila too wishes to meet them. But the situations were not allowing her to meet him.

In the end, while observing that Amarnath aka Ashok hates her mother, now Santhosh and his friends play a drama and finally the entire family reunited.

Cast 

Sivaji Ganesan as SP Santhosh IPS
K. R. Vijaya as Kokila
Major Sundarrajan Kokila's father and Lawyer
Suruli Rajan as Neelakandam
Thengai Srinivasan Younger brother of Lawyer
Y. G. Mahendran
Chakravarthy as Ashok/Amarnath
Reena in guest appearance
Manorama Neelakandan's wife
Leela
K. Vijayan
V. S. Raghavan in guest appearance
Peeli Sivam a bad police officer
Krishnan
Manavalan
Vairam Krishnamoorthy
Baby Preetha (debut) Baby Ashok

Production
Rishimoolam was based on the stage play of the same name. Mahendran who wrote the script of the play also wrote the screenplay for the film adaptation. It was Muthuraman's third collaboration with Ganesan. The song "Aimbadhilum Aasai Varum" was shot in Kallikottai, Kerala.

Soundtrack 
The music was composed by Ilaiyaraaja, with lyrics by Kannadasan. The song "Neramithu" was composed at a hotel in Mamallapuram.

Reception
P. S. M. of Kalki wrote that, rather than dwelving deep about the weak plot, the film can be watched for the performances of Ganesan and Vijaya.

References

Bibliography

External links 
 

1980 films
1980s Tamil-language films
Films directed by S. P. Muthuraman
Films scored by Ilaiyaraaja
Indian films based on plays